The 1573  was one of many battles the warlord Oda Nobunaga fought against the Azai and Asakura clans during Japan's Sengoku period. These two families were among the staunchest opponents of Nobunaga's attempts to seize land and power for himself.

In that year, 1573, Nobunaga besieged Odani castle, which was held by Azai Nagamasa. Asakura Yoshikage, leading a force to relieve and reinforce the Azai garrison, came under attack by Nobunaga's army. He sought refuge in Hikida Castle, and came under siege himself.

Hikida fell on August 10, and Asakura fled back to his home province of Echizen.

References

Hikida 1573
1573 in Japan
Conflicts in 1573
Hikida 1573